Makarije is a Serbian name, a form of the Greek name Makarios.

People with Makarije include:

Hieromonk Makarije - Serbian Printer.
Makarije Sokolović - Patriarch of Peć.